Evelyn Hofer (January 21, 1922 – November 2, 2009) was a German-American portrait and documentary photographer.

Life and work
Hofer was born in Marburg, Germany. The family moved to Geneva in 1933 in order to escape Nazism, and later to Madrid. Evelyn attempted unsuccessfully to enter the Paris Conservatory and then switched to photography, first apprenticing in Zürich and Basel and then taking private tuition in Zürich.

After Franco came to power they moved again, to Mexico in the early 1940s. It was in Mexico that she had her first work as a professional photographer. She moved to New York in 1946, where she worked with Alexey Brodovitch of Harper's Bazaar and befriended Richard Lindner and Saul Steinberg.

Hofer used a four-by-five inch view camera to make orderly and well-constructed portraits and scenic photographs. Her style centered on straightforward compositions that were clear, but not simple. Her portraits show subjects looking lost, sad, or at least ambiguous.

She died in Mexico City, Mexico, aged 87.

Books

Los encantos de Méjico. Text by Maurice Sandoz. 
The Pleasures of Mexico. Text by Maurice Sandoz. New York: Kamin, 1957. 
The Stones of Florence. Text by Mary McCarthy. London: Heinemann, 1956. New York: Harcourt, Brace, Jovanovich, 1959. London: Heinemann, 1976. . San Diego: Harcourt Brace Jovanovich, 1987. .
Florenz. Text by Mary McCarthy. Gütersloh: Bertelsmann, 1960.
London Perceived. Text by V. S. Pritchett. New York: Harcourt, Brace & World, 1962. London: Chatto & Windus / Heinemann, 1962. London: Hogarth, 1986. . Boston: Godine, 1990. . London: Penguin, 2003. . London: Bloomsbury, 2011. .
London. Herz und Antlitz einer Stadt. Text by V. S. Pritchett, trans. Margot Berthold. Munich and Zurich: Droemer, 1964.
New York Proclaimed. Text by V. S. Pritchett. Chatto & Windus / Heinemann, 1965. New York: Harcourt, Brace & World, 1965. London: Reprint Society, 1966.
New York. Herz und Antlitz einer Stadt. Text by V. S. Pritchett. Munich and Zurich: Droemer, 1966.
Dublin: A Portrait. Text by V. S. Pritchett. New York: Harper & Row, 1967. London: Bodley Head, 1967. London: Hogarth, 1991. . London: Bloomsbury, 2011. .
The Presence of Spain. Text by James Morris. New York: Harcourt, Brace & World, 1964. London: Faber & Faber, 1964.
Spanje zoals het is. Text by James Morris. The Hague: Gaade, 1965.
Spanien. Porträt eines stolzen Landes. Text by James Morris, trans. Kai Molvig. Berlin: Deutsche Buch-Gemeinschaft, 1967. Knaur-Taschenbücher 176. Munich: Droemer, 1968. 
The Evidence of Washington. Text by William Walton. New York: Harper & Row, 1966. London: Bodley Head, 1967. 
Portrait: Theory: Photographs and Essays by David Attie, Chuck Close, Jan Groover, Evelyn Hofer, Lotte Jacobi, Gerard Malanga, Robert Mapplethorpe and James Van Der Zee. Edited by Kelly Wise. New York: Lustrum, 1981.
Emerson in Italy. Text by Ralph Waldo Emerson and Evelyn Barish. New York: Holt, 1989. .
Evelyn Hofer: Photographs. Lausanne: Musée de l'Élysée, 1994. .
Evelyn Hofer. Edited by Susanne Breidenbach. Göttingen: Steidl, 2004. . Galerie m. .

Collections
Getty Museum
Museum of Fine Arts Houston

Notes

References

Further reading
Rosenblum, Naomi. A History of Women Photographers. New York: Abbeville, 2014. .   
Hofer, Evelyn; Buhrs, Michael; Schmid, Sabine; Pauly, Andreas; Gerhard Steidl GmbH & Co, oHG. Evelyn Hofer (1922-2009) Retrospektive. Göttingen Steidl, 2015. .

External links
Evelyn Hofer at Galerie m Bochum
 "Evelyn Hofer: Still Lifes"

1922 births
2009 deaths
20th-century American photographers
German emigrants to the United States
People from Marburg
20th-century American women photographers
German expatriates in Switzerland
German expatriates in Spain
German expatriates in Mexico
21st-century American women